Garden City Collegiate (GCC or GC) is a high school in Winnipeg, Manitoba. It is part of the Seven Oaks School Division, and houses grades 9–12. The Garden City motto is "Participation and Excellence."

Garden City Collegiate offers two programs: the English Diploma and the French Immersion Diploma. Garden City is the only high school in Seven Oaks School Division that offers both programs to all students.

The school  has recently joined its 2 formerly separate buildings; the east building was formerly Jefferson Junior High School. It has also had a new commons area and gymnasium built.

Administrators

Notable alumni 
 Randy Bachman – musician (The Guess Who, B.T.O.)
 Marco Bustos – professional soccer player
 Andrea Macasaet - Broadway actress
 Jarred Ogungbemi-Jackson – professional basketball player
 Colton Orr – professional athlete
 Remy Shand – musician

See also
Seven Oaks School Division

References

External links
 Seven Oaks School Division

High schools in Winnipeg
Educational institutions in Canada with year of establishment missing

Seven Oaks, Winnipeg